Darren Lee Wynne (born 12 October 1970) is a Welsh footballer, who played as a midfielder in the Football League for Chester City.

References

Chester City F.C. players
Connah's Quay Nomads F.C. players
Association football midfielders
English Football League players
20th-century births
Living people
1970 births
Welsh footballers
Sportspeople from Flintshire